Tropidothorax cruciger is a species of seed bug in the family Lygaeidae found in Asia.

References

External links

 

Lygaeidae
Insects described in 1859